Black Holes, Wormholes and Time Machines is a book by physicist Jim Al-Khalili, published in 1999. Al-Khalili talks about a range of modern science topics, from geometry to the theory of relativity.

References

Popular science books
1999 non-fiction books